This is a list of the 95 episodes of the comedy television series The Man Show, airing on Comedy Central from 1999 to 2004 that starred Adam Carolla and Jimmy Kimmel; the final 22 episodes were hosted by Doug Stanhope and Joe Rogan, before its cancellation in 2004.

Series overview

Episodes

Season 1 (1999–2000)

Season 2 (2000–01)

Season 3 (2001–02)

Season 4 (2002–03)

Season 5 (2003)

Eleven episodes, the first airing 17 August 2003. Hosts Doug Stanhope and Joe Rogan. Season episode data at IMDB

Season 6 (2004)

Eleven episodes, the first airing 2 May 2004. Hosts Doug Stanhope and Joe Rogan. Season episode data at IMDB

Man Show, The